Use of chemical weapons in the War in Iraq (2013–2017) by ISIL has been confirmed by the OPCW and US defense officials.

Incidents

Reported attacks
The table below lists reported chemical weapons attacks in the Iraqi Civil War.

Confirmed attacks
After around 35 Kurdish soldiers were injured during fighting against Islamic State militants southwest of Erbil in August 2015, samples were taken 
by OPCW in an investigation directed by the Iraqi government. In February 2016, a source at the OPCW confirmed that the samples tested positive for mustard gas.

See also
 Use of chemical weapons in the Syrian civil war
 Iraq and weapons of mass destruction
 Iraqi chemical weapons program

Notes

References

Iraq
Chemical weapons
Chemical warfare